Tourism in Chhattisgarh refers to tourism in Indian state of Chhattisgarh. It is India's 10th largest state and situated in the heart of India, is endowed with a rich cultural heritage and attractive natural diversity. The state has many ancient monuments, rare wildlife, exquisitely carved temples, Buddhist sites, palaces, water falls, caves, rock paintings and hill plateaus. 

Most of these sites are untouched and unexplored and offer a unique and alternate experience to tourists, compared to traditional destinations which have become overcrowded. For tourists who are tired of the crowds at major destinations will like the Bastar district, with its unique cultural and ecological identity. The green state of Chhattisgarh has 41.33% of its area under forests and is one of the richest bio-diversity areas in the country.

Waterfalls

Chhattisgarh can be considered as the tourist attraction for waterfalls in Central India. Due to the three main physio-graphic division i.e. 1. Northern Hills, 2. Central Plains and 3. Southern Plateaus, Chhattisgarh is blessed with numerous perennial and seasonal waterfalls, some of the names of which are given below:

List of Waterfalls of Chhattisgarh

Dantewada District
 Saat Dhaar Waterfall
 Jhara Lava Waterfall
 Malangir Waterfall
 Fulpaad Waterfall

Kondagaon District
 Katulkasa Waterfall, Honhed
 Bijkudum Waterfall, Uper-murvend
 Umradah Waterfall
 Ling-Darha Waterfall
 Amadarha-1 Waterfall
 Amadarha-2 Waterfall
 Hankhi-kudum Waterfall
 Ghumur Waterfall
 Kudarwahi Waterfall
 Uperbedi Waterfall
 Mirde Waterfall
 Mutte-Khadka Waterfall
 Cherbeda Waterfall

Bastar District

 Chitrakote Falls 
 Teerathgarh Falls
 Chitra Dhara Falls 
 Tamda Ghumar
 Mendri Ghumar

 Mandwa Waterfalls
 Jhulna Darha Falls
 Chik-Narra Falls
 Shiv-Ganga Falls
 Bhunbhuni Falls
 Bijakasaa Falls
 Kanger Dhara Falls
 Kunduru Nala Waterfall
 Vijay Ghumar Waterfall
 Topar Waterfall
 Toyer Nala Waterfall
 Lude Ghumar Waterfall
 Dordori Waterfalls
 Maajur Tondri Waterfall
 Udli Bahar Waterfall
 Madhota Waterfalls
 Alwa Dongripara Waterfall

Jashpur District

 Dangiri
 Ranidah
 Kotebira
 Rajpuri
 Bhringraj
 Gullu 
 Churi
 Bane

Korba District
 Damau Dhara
 Deopahri Waterfall
 Kendai waterfall
Nakiya waterfall
Rani jhariya
 Satrenga
 Buka
 Coffee & Tiger Point
 khetar
parsakhola
bango dam
 goldan island
 jhoraghat
 bhamarjhajha waterfall
 teenjhariya waterfall

Dhamtari District

 Narhara

Kanker District
 Malaj-kudum
 Charre-Marre

Korea District
 Amrit-Dhara Waterfall
 Ramdah Waterfall
 Gaurghat Waterfall (Tarra, Sonhat)
 Akuri Nala Waterfall
 Karam ghongha Waterfall

Bijapur District
 Lankapalli WF
 Bogtum Waterfall
 Nambi Dhara
 Satdhara waterfall

Surguja District
 Tiger point waterfall
 Fish point waterfall
 Ghaghi waterfall
 Perwaghaghi waterfall
 Mahadevmuda waterfall
 Jama-labji waterfall

Gariyaband

 Godena Falls
 Deo-Dhara
 Chingra-Pagaar
 Jatmai Falls
 Ghata-rani Falls
 Gajpalla Falls
 Kari-pagaar Fall
 Baniya Dhans Fall
 Budhha Raja Falls
 Sindurikhol Fall
 Jharjhara Falls

Rajnandgaon
 Hajra Falls

Temples

Notable and ancient temples in Chhattisgarh include: Shri Ram Janki Temple at Setganga in Mungeli District, Bhoramdeo temple near Kawardha in Kabirdham district, Rajivlochan temple at Rajim and Champaran in Raipur district, Chandrahasini Devi temple at Chandrapur, Vishnu temple at Janjgir, Damudhara (Rishab Tirth) and Sivarinarayana Laxminarayana temple in Janjgir-Champa district, Bambleshwari Temple at Dongargarh in Rajnandgaon district, Danteshwari Temple in Dantewada district, Deorani-Jethani temple at Tala gram and Mahamaya temple at Ratanpur in Bilaspur district, Laxman temple at Sirpur in Mahasamund district, Uwasaggaharam Parshwa Teerth at Nagpura in Durg district, Pali with Lord Shiva temple and Kharod with Lakshmaneswar temple, Patal Bhairavi temple in outer area of Rajnandgaon.

Giraudhpuri is a religious place for the Satnamis. They are the followers of Satnampanth.

Sirpur is proposed world heritage site and Malhar are of historical significance, as they were visited by Xuanzang, the Chinese historian. Mama-bachha temple at Barsoor.

The hot spring known as Taat Pani, (taat - hot, pani - water) the hot spring flows in Balrampur district. This hot spring flows throughout the year and is reputed to have medicinal properties due to its high sodium content.
National Thermal Power Corporation Limited is developing a geothermal power plant at Taat Pani, which is described as the first geothermal power plant in India.

Ancient Temples List

Dantewada District
 Mama Bhanja temple, Barsur
 Battisa Temple, Barsur
 Goddess Danteshwari temple, Dantewada
 Samloor Mahadev Temple
 Chandraditya temple, Barsur

Bastar District

 Gumadpal Mahadev Temple
 Mahadev Temple, Bastar
 Devarli temple, Dodrepal, near Tokapal
 Shiv temple, Chhindgaon, Bastar
 Ruined Shiv temple, Gudhiyari, Kesharpal, Bastar
 Shiv temple, Singhaigudi, Ghumarmundpara, Chitrakote

Raipur District

 Mahadev temple, Chandkhuri
 Mahadev Temple, Nawagaon
 Mahadev Temple, Girod
 Bhand Dewal temple, Arang

Durg District
 Mahadev temple, Dev-baloda, near Charoda, Bhilai
 Mahadev Temple, Nagpura, Durg
 Lord Parshva nath Temple, Nagpura, Durg

Bilaspur District
 Mahamaya Temple, Ratanpur
 Ancient Shiva Temple, Kirari Gordhi
 Deorani – Jethani Temple, Amarikampa
 Shiv temple, Belpan, Takhatpur
 Bhima-Kichak temple, Malhar, Masturi
 Madku Dwip Temples, Bilaspur Raipur Highway, Bilaspur

Janjgir-Champa
 Goddess Shabari temple, Sheori-Narayan
 Lord Ram temple, Sheori-Narayan
 Laxmaneshwar temple, Sheori-Narayan
 Lord Vishnu temple, Janjgir
 Ruined Shiv temple, Adbhar, Shakti

Gariyaband

 Rajiv Lochan temple, Rajim
 Lord Ramchandra temple, Rajim
 Lord Balkrishna temple, Rajim
 Goddess Mavli temple, Rajim
 Kuleshwar Mahadev temple, Rajim

Mahasamund

 Laxman temple, Sirpur

 Surang Tila temple, Sirpur

 Anand Prabhu kuti Vihar (Tiwar dev temple), Sirpur
 Swastik Vihar, Sirpur
 Jagannath temple, Bagbahara

Balod
 Kukur dev temple, Khapari, Balod
 Jagannathpur Shiv temple
 Kapileshwar Group of temples, Balod
 Ancient temple, Dondilohara
 Shiv temple, Palari, Balod

Surguja
 Goddess Ambika temple, Ambikapur
 Shiv temple, Devgarh, Udaipur
 Deur temple, Maharanipur, Sitapur
 Devi temple (Chherika Deur), Devtikra, Udaipur
 Group of temples, Satmahla, Kalcha-Bhadwahi, Udaipur

Balodabazar
 Chitvari devi temple, Dhobani, Simga
 Mavli devi temple, Tarponga, Simga
 Siddheshwar Shiv temple, Palari
 Ancient Ruined temple, Damru

National parks and wildlife sanctuaries

Achanakmar Wildlife Sanctuary in the Mungeli district, Gamarda Reserve forest at Sarangarh in the Raigarh district, Indravati National Park and Kanger Ghati National Park in the Bastar district, Barnawapara Wildlife Sanctuary in the Mahasamund district, Udanti Wildlife Sanctuary in the Raipur district, and Sitanadi Wildlife Sanctuary in the Dhamtari district are good places for eco-tourism.

There is also Guru Ghasidas National Park. The natural environment of Koriya includes many dense forests, mountains, rivers and waterfalls, and is known for the rich mineral deposits. Coal is found in abundance in this part of the country. The dense forests present here have a rich wildlife, and the district was where the last known Asiatic cheetah was spotted in the wilderness of India. The climate of Koriya is quite pleasant. The mild summers and cool winters make Koriya a suitable place to visit throughout the year.

List of National Parks 
 Kanger Ghati National Park, Bastar District (Area: 200 km2)
 Indravati National Park, Bijapur District (Area: 1258 km2)
 Guru Ghasi Das National Park, Korea District (Area: 2898.705 km2)

List of Sanctuaries 
 Achanakmar, Bilaspur/Mungeli 1975
 Bhairamgarh, Bijapur 1983
 Barnawapara, Balodabazaar 1976
 Gomarda, Raigarh 1975
 Pamed, Bijapur 1983
 Semarsot. Balrampur 1978
 Sitanadi, Dhamtari 1974
 Udanti, Gariyaband 1972
 Tamor Pingla, Surguja 1978
 Bhoramdeo, Kawardha 2001

Caves and archaeological sites
Gadiya mountain in Kanker district, Kotumsar cave in Bastar district, Kailash gufa in Jashpur district, Ramgarh and Sita Bengra in Surguja district and Singhanpur cave in Raigarh district with pre-historic paintings are well known. There are cave paintings at Ongana and Kabra Pahad near Raigarh, though most of the paintings lie in open and have been over written by graffiti. Archaeological sites worth seeing are Barsoor in Dantewada district, Malhar and Ratanpur in Bilaspur district, Sirpur in Mahasamund district, Koriya in Koriya district and Surguja in Surguja district. A small picnic spot with waterfall on the extremity of Satpura range along with a stone inscription of c. 1st century CE is found at Damau dhara in Janjgir-Champa district.

List of some Caves found in Chhattisgarh

Bastar District 

 Aranyak Cave Kanger Ghati National Park
 Dandak Cave Kanger Ghati National Park
 Kailash Caves Kanger Ghati National Park
 Devgiri Cave  Kanger Ghati National Park
 Jhumar Cave Kanger Ghati National Park
 Kanak Cave Kanger Ghati National Park
 Kotumsar Cave 
 Mendhkamaari Cave Kanger Ghati National Park
 Rani Cave Kanger Ghati National Park

 Gumalwada Cave Kanger Ghati National Park

Kanker District 
 Jogi Cave, Gadiya Mountain Kanker
 Sondayee Cave, Kanker

Jashpur district 
 Kailash Cave 
 Khudiya Rani Cave

Rajnandgaon district 
 Mandipkhol Cave

Bijapur
 Shakal-Narayan Cave, Bijapur
 Shankanpalli Cave, Bijapur
 Usur Cave, Bijapur

Surguja

 Jogi-mara 
 Sita-bengra
 Laxman Bengra
 Haathi-pol

Raigarh District 

 Kurra Cave
 Singhanpur cave
 Botalda cave

Dams
Dams, not only used for Irrigation and Hydro-electricity generation, but also serve the purpose for Artificial Eco-tourism. Some of the main projects of Chhattisgarh are as follows: 
 Gangrel Dam (Dhamtari)
 Madumsilli/Murumsilli Reservoir (Dhamtari)
 Rudri Pick-up Weir (Dhamtari)
 Dhudhawa Reservoir (Dhamtari)
 Sondhur Dam (Dhamtari)
 Sikasaar Dam (Gaariyaband)
 Minimata (Hasdeo-Bango) Dam Project (Korba)
 Kelo Dam (Raigarh)
 Kodar (Veer Narayan Singh) Dam (Mahasamund)
 Bhainsajhar Dam (Bilaspur)
 Khuntaghat Reservoir (Bilaspur)
 Tandula Dam/reservoir (Balod)

See also
 Central India
 Rihand River
 Son River

References

External links